Echo Park is a 1986 American comedy-drama film set in the Echo Park neighborhood of Los Angeles, California. The plot follows several aspiring actors, musicians and models. The cast includes Tom Hulce, Susan Dey, Cheech Marin and Michael Bowen. Cassandra Peterson, better known as Elvira, has a brief cameo as a secretary. Echo Park was the final film of veteran actor Timothy Carey.

Plot
May, a single mom, wants to become an actress. Her next-door neighbor August, a bodybuilder, wants to become a worthy successor to his hero, Arnold Schwarzenegger. They live in a district of Los Angeles known as Echo Park, not far from Dodger Stadium, and dream of a better life.

Jonathan, a pizza delivery boy, arrives at May's door and is immediately smitten with her. As he entertains her young son, Henry, she goes out to pursue an acting opportunity that has come along, only to discover that it involves disrobing in private residences, delivering "strip-o-grams." May gives the strip-o-grams a try and August tries to meet his idol at a reception at the Austrian embassy, while Jonathan worries that the two are more than mere neighbors.

Cast
Susan Dey as May Greer
Tom Hulce as Jonathan
Michael Bowen as August Reichtenstein
Christopher Walker as Henry Greer
Shirley Jo Finney as Gloria
Heinrich Schweiger as Mr. Reichtenstein
Cheech Marin as Syd
John Paragon as Hugo
Cassandra Peterson as Sheri
Timothy Carey as Vinnie
Robert R. Shafer as Commercial Director
Skip O'Brien as Prisoner
Biff Yeager as Jailer

Reception
Echo Park maintains a 78% fresh rating at Rotten Tomatoes. Roger Ebert gave the film three out of four stars, saying that the film "has no great statement to make and no particular plot to unfold. Its ambition is to introduce us to these people and let them live with us for a while. The movie is low-key, unaffected and sometimes very funny."

References

External links
 
 Echo Park at AMC
 
 
 

1986 comedy-drama films
1986 films
American comedy-drama films
Atlantic Entertainment Group films
Films set in Los Angeles
Films directed by Robert Dornhelm
1980s English-language films
1980s American films